The Foundation for International Medical Relief of Children (FIMRC) is a U.S.-based nonprofit organization dedicated to providing healthcare to medically underserved families worldwide. FIMRC currently conducts medical care clinics or projects in nine countries, including Ecuador, the Philippines, Costa Rica, El Salvador, Dominican Republic, India, Nicaragua, Peru and Uganda.

History
FIMRC was founded in 2002 by Vikram Bakhru, a then-medical student (at George Washington University). Today, FIMRC coordinates the volunteer efforts and clinical rotations of over 700 people annually, and has provided medical care, either directly or indirectly, to hundreds of thousands of children, mothers and families across the globe.

Activities
FIMRC operates a Global Health Volunteer Program aimed at immersion in the local health care system, as well as community development. Speciality program is also available depending on academic and professional needs. Sample programs include: CHIRP (Comparative Healthcare Immersion Rotation Program) as an elective credit rotation program designed to provide third and fourth-year medical students with exposure to healthcare in developing countries.  Students who participate in CHIRP typically receive focused lectures, clinical exposure, community health experience. Additional programs include the Summer International Health Fellowship, their Internship Program, a Nursing Rotation Program, among others. FIMRC also partners with UniversalGiving, an online nonprofit organization to offer its volunteer placement program in countries listed below.

See also 

 International Medical Relief
 Red Cross Society of China

References

External links 
 FIMRC website

Health charities in the United States
Non-profit organizations based in Pennsylvania
Medical and health foundations in the United States
Medical and health organizations based in Pennsylvania